Ballaghaderreen GAA is a Gaelic Athletic Association club based in Ballaghaderreen, County Roscommon. The main sport played is Gaelic football. When the club was founded in 1885, the town was located in County Mayo and went under the name "Faugh A Ballagh".

Ballaghaderreen GAA Club is almost as old as the Gaelic Athletic Association itself. A note in the Western People newspaper states that the club met in 1886 for a practice match. This was the first meeting of the club since the previous year-1885. The game referred to was played in a field given by Mrs. Deane, a cousin of Mr. John Dillon. The Sports field was situated next door to the Convent and was vested in (and still is) in local trustees. The Congested Districts Board gave it to Bishop John Lyster, Fr. J O’Connor Administrator and Mr. James Gordon, a local business man. It also included a cinder running track for cycling and many athletic meetings were held there. In 1898 Ballaghaderreen was transferred from County Mayo to County Roscommon under the Local Government Act relating to Poor Law Unions. The Gaelic Athletic Club retained its affiliation to the Mayo Board.

The new GAA pitch and clubhouse were developed and opened in 1980. The new stand was constructed in 1995. The club's facilities went under major reconstruction in the naughties with the pitches being redeveloped into a full sized pitch and a slightly smaller training pitch with proper drainage and the addition of a sanded area for winter training. The clubhouse was also redeveloped with the dressing rooms and shower getting a complete overhaul and the meeting rooms and gym being extended upstairs.

The club has been well represented at county level through the years, with Andy Moran and David Drake recently on the senior panel. David McBrien currently represents the club on the May senior panel.

Notable players
 Noel Durkin
 Dermot Flanagan
 Pearce Hanley
 Andy Moran
 John Morley

Honours
Mayo Senior Football Championships (3): 1972, 2008, 2012
Mayo Senior Hurling Championships (4): 1923, 1924, 1950, 1953

References

Gaelic football clubs in County Mayo
Gaelic football clubs in County Roscommon
Gaelic games clubs in County Mayo